The Strata Exam is a CompTIA certification. It covers the fundamentals of various other areas of IT study. Below is a chart of each section of the Strata test and how much it comprises the exam:

Examinations
Information technology qualifications